French Island can refer to:

French Island (Victoria), in Australia
French Island, Wisconsin, in the United States
French Island No. 1 and French Island No. 2 in the Ohio River in Kentucky
 French Island, an island in Ellis Pond, Oxford County, Maine, United States
French Island, a neighbourhood of Old Town, Penobscot County, Maine, United States